Rapel Lake (Spanish: Lago Rapel or Embalse Rapel) is an artificial lake created by a dam on the Rapel River. It is located in the Libertador General Bernardo O'Higgins Region, Central Chile.

The reservoir was created with the aim of feeding the Rapel Hydroelectric Plant.

Sources 
 Cuenca del río Rapel

Lakes of O'Higgins Region
Rapel